Carlo Gabriel Redgrave Nero (born Carlo Gabriel Sparanero; 16 September 1969) is an Italian-English screenwriter and film director.

Biography 
The son of actors Franco Nero and Vanessa Redgrave, his maternal half-sisters are actresses Joely Richardson and Natasha Richardson (1963–2009). He is the nephew of actors Corin (1939–2010) and Lynn Redgrave (1943–2010), and cousin to actress Jemma Redgrave. Carlo Nero directed his mother and half-sister Joely in the 2004 film The Fever.

Filmography
 Larry's Visit (1996)
 Uninvited (1999)
 The Fever (2004)

Discography 
 1985 – Will Change The World/Cambierà (Lovers, LVNP 802, 7" – with his father, the Italian actor Franco Nero)

Awards
 2005: Bratislava International Film Festival: Grand Prix: The Fever: Nominated

References

External links

 Carlo Gabriel Nero at Allmovie

Italian film directors
English film directors
Italian male screenwriters
English male screenwriters
Italian people of English descent
English people of Italian descent
Male actors from London
1969 births
Living people
Redgrave family